Loss of Face may refer to:
"Loss of Face", episode in the first season of Bump in the Night
"Loss of Face", episode of Mummies Alive!
"Loss of Face", exhibition by British photographic artist John Goto
Loss of face, a social concept to describe humiliation